P.D. Jackson-Olin High School (J-O) is a four-year public high school in Birmingham, Alabama. It is one of seven high schools in the Birmingham City School System. Founded in 1952 as Western Olin High School, it was later renamed P.D. Jackson-Olin High School to honor its first principal, Dr. Pierre Denson Jackson, who led the school to excellence during its first 21 years. The school in its current form took shape in 2006 when J-O merged with Ensley High School as part of systemwide school consolidation. School colors are kelly green and gold, and the athletic teams are called the mustangs. J-O competes in AHSAA Class 6A athletics.

Student Profile 
Enrollment in grades 9-12 for the 2013–14 school year is 1,073 students. Approximately 98% of students are African-American, 1% are Hispanic, and 1% are multiracial. Roughly 91% of students qualify for free or reduced price lunch.

J-O has a graduation rate of 47%. Approximately 73% of its students meet or exceed proficiency standards in both reading and mathematics. The average ACT score for J-O students is 19.

Campus
In fall 2006, Jackson-Olin moved to a new $30.8 million  building and merged its student body with the former Ensley High School. The new school has a capacity of 1,800 students in 90 classrooms on 2 floors. There is a 450-seat cafeteria, 1,800-seat gymnasium, 750-seat auditorium, a practice gym and a football stadium at the new campus. A career wing houses classrooms for auto repair, welding, and culinary arts as well as science labs. Goodwyn Mills and Cawood were the architects for the new building, and Doster Construction was the general contractor.

Athletics 
J-O competes in AHSAA Class 6A athletics and fields teams in the following sports:
 Baseball
 Basketball (boys and girls)
 Cheerleading
 Football
 Indoor Track & Field (boys and girls)
 Outdoor Track & Field (boys and girls)
 Soccer
 Softball
 Volleyball
J-O won the 1989 AHSAA state championship in girls' outdoor track and field.

Extracurricular Activities

Marching Band
The Jackson-Olin High School marching band, the "Mean Green Marching Machine" (MGMM) is known for its showmanship and entertaining musical performances. Mr. Amos F. "Flash" Gordon organized and served as the school's first band director for more than 25 years. A Western-Olin graduate himself, Mr. Donald M. "D.C" Crawford has served as the head band director for more than 32 years, leading the band to numerous awards and performances. The band performed at the 2000 inaugural ceremony for Mr. Bernard Kincaid, Jackson-Olin Alumnus and former mayor of Birmingham, Alabama.

Mr. Daniel "Jose" Carr Jr. proceeded Donald Crawford as Jackson Olin's 3rd band director in 2011. Daniel Carr Jr. was also featured in the Jazz Hall of Fame. In 2014, Professor Kendall Forde, a graduate of Albany State University (Bachelor's Degree) and Alabama State University (Master's Degree), took command of the "Mean Green Marching Machine" after the retirement of Daniel Carr Jr and became the band's fourth band director. In 2013, the band competed against all other Birmingham City Schools at the band evaluations located at G.W. Carver High School, J-O came in 1st place. The feature dancers of the marching band are the "Golden Phillies." The "Dazzling Diamonds" are the flag team.

Notable alumni
Vonetta Flowers, gold medalist bobsledder at the 2002 Winter Olympics
Bernard Kincaid, former two-term mayor of Birmingham
David Palmer, former running back for the University of Alabama and Minnesota Vikings
Reggie King, former basketball player for the University of Alabama, Kansas City Kings, and Seattle SuperSonics
Mike Anderson, head basketball coach for the University of Arkansas
Eddie Kendricks, Motown singer

External links 
J-O school website

J-O school profile on SchoolDigger
J-O school profile on Niche

References

High schools in Birmingham, Alabama
Educational institutions established in 1952
Public high schools in Alabama
Schools in Jefferson County, Alabama
1952 establishments in Alabama